"Mohe Rang Do Laal" is a song from the 2015 Blockbuster Bollywood film, Bajirao Mastani. The song is composed by Sanjay Leela Bhansali and sung by Shreya Ghoshal and Pandit Birju Maharaj. The lyrics were penned by Siddharth-Garima. The song features Deepika Padukone and Ranveer Singh in the video. Padukone took Kathak dance lessons from Pandit Birju Maharaj, who also choreographed the song. The movie was dubbed in Tamil and Telugu and hence the song was also released as "Podhai Nirathai Thaa" in Tamil and "Meera Chittachora" in Telugu on 15 December 2015. Shreya Ghoshal and Pandit Birju Maharaj rendered their voice to all the three versions of the song. The song was reprised in MTV Unplugged Season 6 and was also rendered by Ghoshal.

Accolades

See also
Bajirao Mastani
Bajirao Mastani (soundtrack)
Deewani Mastani

References

External links 
 iTunes
 Online streaming at Saavn
 Online streaming at Gaana
 Online streaming at Saavn of Tamil version
 Online streaming at Saavn of Telugu version

Hindi songs
Hindi film songs
Shreya Ghoshal songs
Songs written for films
2015 songs